Martti Meinilä (10 November 1927 – 2005) was a Finnish biathlete. He competed in the 20 km individual event at the 1960 Winter Olympics.

References

External links
 

1927 births
2005 deaths
Biathletes at the 1960 Winter Olympics
Finnish male biathletes
Olympic biathletes of Finland
People from Salla
Sportspeople from Lapland (Finland)